Bicknor is a village and civil parish in the Maidstone district of Kent, England, north-east of Maidstone and south-west of Sittingbourne.  It had a population of 68 according to the 2001 census.

References

External links

Villages in Kent
Civil parishes in Kent